Jyoti Prasad Rajkhowa (born 1944) was the  Governor of Arunachal Pradesh, a state in northeast India, served August 2016. A retired Indian Administrative Service officer of the 1968 batch, he ended his career as Chief Secretary of Assam.

Education
He did M.A. in Economics from the Delhi School of Economics. Earlier Rajkhowa finished his schooling from Jorhat Government High School, Intermediate in Arts from J.B. College, Jorhat, and B.A. (Hons.) in Economics from Cotton College, Guwahati.

Writings
He was appointed the Governor of Arunachal Pradesh on 12 May 2015.

While on deputation to the National Thermal Power Corporation Ltd (NTPC), New Delhi, a Government of India Public Sector Enterprise, he guided and supervised the publication of the "Do's & Don't's" and was also the Chairman of the Editorial Board of the journal titled "Sachetak". Mr Rajkhowa also authored a book, Central Vigilance Mechanism with special reference to P.S.E's, besides contributing a number of articles to leading newspapers.

The major work of Mr Rajkhowa, which earned him accolade from historians, scholars, intellectuals, military experts and the general readers, is Generalissimo Chilarai and his times, a historical biography on the legendary Koch king Chilarai.

Rajkhowa's other influential work was his second historical biography called Sankardeva: His life preachings & practices. The book's topic was Srimanta Sankardeva, a cultural and religious figure of Assamese history.

References

1944 births
Living people
Delhi School of Economics alumni
Writers from Assam
Indian editors
Cotton College, Guwahati alumni
Governors of Arunachal Pradesh
Indian Administrative Service officers